Momino is a village in the municipality of Haskovo, in Haskovo Province, in southern Bulgaria.

Honours
Momino Point on Brabant Island, Antarctica is named after the village.

References

Villages in Haskovo Province